The Don Camilo is a Parisian cabaret established in 1954 by Jean Vergnes. It is located in the 7th arrondissement of Paris in the Saint-Germain-des-Prés quartier. 

Every evening of the week, a dîner-spectacle is organised. The entertainment is provided by many artists who very often came forward with this show place. These artists are generally singers, impersonators, comedians, chansonniers or ventriloquists. They follow each other on stage at a rapid pace (about every twenty minutes), except the star-artist who performs longer after the meal.

Artists 
Partial list of artists "boarders" of the Don Camilo from 1954 to 2009

  Stephane Gali
 Jean Amadou
 André Aubert
 Hugues Aufray
 AudéYoann
 René Baron alias René-Louis Baron
 Jean-Louis Blèze
 Pierre-Yves Noël
 Franck Brun
 Pascal Brunner
 Pascal Chevalier
 Philippe Clay
 Sylvain Collaro
 Darry Cowl 
 Jean Constantin
 Dadzu
 David et Nestor
 Carine Davis
 Gérard Delaleau
 Pierre Douglas
 Charles Dumont 
 Gérald Dahan
 Léo Ferré
 Thierry Garcia
 Laurent Gerra
 Michaël Gregorio
 Daniel Guichard
 Fabienne Guyon
 Jack Hammer (The Platters)
 Martin Kardone
 Yann Jamet
 Serge Lama
 Robert Lamoureux 
 Michel Leeb
 Serge Llado
 Thierry Le Luron
 Olivier Lejeune
 Enrico Macias
 Bernard Mabille
 Mathieu 
 Merry
 Dany Mauro
 Claude Nougaro
 Gilles Olivier
 Pierre Perret
 Yves Pujol
 Jean Raymond
 Serge Reggiani
 Jean Roucas
 Laurent Ruquier
 Catherine Sauvage
 Henri Tisot
 Charles Trenet
 Jean Vallée
 Les Frères Ennemis
 Le Trio Athénée
 Patrick Peralta 
 Christie Caro

References 

Cabarets in Paris
Buildings and structures in the 7th arrondissement of Paris